Marianne Stuwe (born 23 September 1955) is a German former professional racing cyclist. She won the German National Road Race Championship in 1976.

References

External links

1955 births
Living people
German female cyclists
Place of birth missing (living people)
20th-century German women
21st-century German women